In France, and around the world, many things have been named after Charles de Gaulle.

France
Many streets and public buildings in France bear the name of Charles de Gaulle. They include:
 Paris-Charles de Gaulle Airport
 Charles de Gaulle, an aircraft carrier in the Marine Nationale
 Place Charles de Gaulle, historically known as the Place de l'Étoile, the name of the large plaza around the Arc de Triomphe in Paris. It is frequently referred to as Charles de Gaulle – Étoile, which is the name of the Métro and RER station under it.
 Avenue Charles de Gaulle, Neuilly, the extension of one of the many avenues in Paris that radiate from the Charles de Gaulle-Étoile
 In addition, a large number of cities and towns in France have a street and/or a square named after de Gaulle. Considering the number of towns where this is the case, it would be impractical to attempt to list them all here.

Outside France
De Gaulle is also commemorated outside France, particularly in street names. These include:
 Belgium
 Place Charles de Gaulle (Antoing)
 Avenue du Général de Gaulle (Brussels)
 Place Charles de Gaulle (Mouscron)
 Charles de Gaullestraat (Ronse)
 Place Charles de Gaulle (Verviers)
 Pont Charles de Gaulle (Dinant)
 Brazil
 Rua Charles de Gaulle (Joinville)
 Rua General de Gaulle (Osasco )
 Rua Charles de Gaulle (São Luís)
 Avenida General Charles de Gaulle (São Paulo)
 Rua General Charles de Gaulle (Boa Viagem, Recife)
 Cambodia
 Charles de Gaulle Boulevard (Phnom Penh)
 Charles de Gaulle Street (Siem Reap)
 Cameroon
 Avenue du Général de Gaulle (Douala)
 Chad
 Avenue Charles de Gaulle (N'djamena)
 Canada
 Boulevard De Gaulle (Lorraine)
 Charles-De Gaulle bridge (Montreal)
 Place Charles-De Gaulle (Montréal)
 Charles de Gaulle Obelisk (Montreal)
 Avenue De Gaulle (Québec)
 Rue De Gaulle (Longueuil)
 Chile
 Avenida Charles de Gaulle (Arica)
 Calle Charles de Gaulle (Valparaíso)
 Calle General de Gaulle (Santiago, Chile)
 Côte d'Ivoire
 Avenue du Général de Gaulle (Abidjan)
 Czech Republic
 Charlese de Gaulla (Prague)
 Dominican Republic
 Avenida Charles de Gaulle (Santo Domingo)
 Egypt
 Charles de Gaulle Avenue, formerly known as Giza Street, in the Giza area of Cairo
 Ethiopia
 General De Gaulle Square (Addis Ababa)
 Germany
 Charles de Gaulle Avenue (Berlin)
 École de Gaulle-Adenauer  (Bonn)
 Charles de Gaulle Straße (Bonn)
Charles-de-Gaulle-Platz (Cologne)
 Charles de Gaulle Straße (Erkelenz)
 Charles de Gaulle Straße (Landau in der Pfalz)
 Charles de Gaulle Straße (Munich)
 Charles de Gaulle Straße (Weißenburg)
 Charles de Gaulle Straße (Wertheim am Main)
 Charles de Gaulle Straße (Wiesbaden)
 Italy
 Via Charles De Gaulle Licata
 Lebanon
 Avenue General de Gaulle (Beirut)
 Paraguay
 Calle Charles de Gaulle (Asunción)
 Mauritius
 Charles De Gaulle Street (Beau Bassin)
 Mexico
 Parque Charles de Gaulle (Guadalajara)
 Calle Charles de Gaulle, (Naucalpan)
 Montenegro
 Bulevar Šarla de Gola (Podgorica)
 Netherlands
 De Gaullelaan (Delft)
 De Gaullestraat (Doetinchem)
 De Gaullesingel (Ede)
 Charles de Gaullestraat (Roermond)
 Charles de Gaullestraat (Rotterdam)
 Poland
 Rondo gen. Charles’a de Gaulle’a (Warsaw)
 Aleja Generała Charles’a de Gaulle’a (Wałbrzych)
 Ulica Charles’a de Gaulle’a (Malbork)
 Szkoła im. Charles' de Gaulle’a (Gimnazjum nr 122 w Warszawie) (Warsaw)
 Szkoła im. Charles' de Gaulle’a (Szkoła Podstawowa nr 56, Gimnazjum z Oddziałami Dwujęzycznymi numer 29 i XVI LO) (Poznań)
 Ulica Charles’a de Gaulle’a (Gdańsk)
 Ulica Charles’a de Gaulle’a (Tychy)
 Pomnik Charles'a de Gaulle'a (Warsaw)
 Pomnik Charles’a de Gaulle’a przy Domu Muzyki i Tańca, tablica pamiątkowa z wizyty (Zabrze)
 Ulica Charles’a de Gaulle’a (Zabrze)
 Romania
 Piaţa Charles de Gaulle (Bucharest)
 Russia
 Charles de Gaulle Square (Moscow)
 Senegal
 Boulevard du Général de Gaulle (Dakar)
 Spain
 Carrer de Gaulle (San Fulgencio)
 South Africa
 Charles de Gaulle Crescent (Centurion, Gauteng)
 Turkey
 Dögol Caddesi  (Ankara)
 Lycée Français Charles de Gaulle, Ankara
 United Kingdom
 Lycée Français Charles de Gaulle (London)
 United States
 De Gaulle Street (North and South) (Aurora, Colorado, Fort Worth, Texas)
 De Gaulle Place (El Paso, TX)
 De Gaulle Street (Iowa City, IA)
 General De Gaulle Drive (Algiers, New Orleans, Louisiana, USA)
 De Gaulle Court (Youngstown, OH)
 Uruguay
 Rbla. Pte. Charles De Gaulle (Montevideo)

People
 Charles de Gaulle, former member of the European Parliament for the National Front Party, was named after his grandfather.

See also 
 Names and terms of address used for Charles de Gaulle

Charles de Gaulle
De Gaulle, Charles